Dil, Diya, Dehleez is an Urdu-language novel written by Riffat Siraj and published in 1999 by Khazina-e-Ilam o Adab, Karachi. The novel was first published in Khawateen Digest, an Urdu monthly journal.

Plot
The novel is about a woman named Zaitoon Bano and her life revolving around her of sorrow and pain. Based on her own revenge, she influences the lives of many without realizing how her actions can impact others. The story unfolds over two generations and reveals the secrets of many characters.

Adaptation
In 2006, the novel was adapted by Hum TV into a television series of the same name directed by Yasir Nawaz. It stars Hiba Ali, Faisal Shah, Angeline Malik, Javeria Abbasi and Samina Peerzada.

References

External links
 ''Dil, Diya, Dehleez on Goodreads
 Dil, Diya, Dehleez on amzone

1999 novels
Pakistani novels
Family saga novels